Coolbanagher is a civil parish and townland in County Laois, Ireland. The Church of Ireland church is St John, Coolanagher.

References

Civil parishes of County Laois
Townlands of County Laois
Church of Ireland parishes in the Republic of Ireland